The Apache Commons is a project of the Apache Software Foundation, formerly under the Jakarta Project. The purpose of the Commons is to provide reusable, open source Java software. The Commons is composed of three parts: proper, sandbox, and dormant.

Commons Proper 
The Commons Proper is dedicated to creating and maintaining reusable Java components. The Commons Proper is a place for collaboration and sharing, where developers from throughout the Apache community can work together on projects to be shared by Apache projects and Apache users.
Commons developers will make an effort to ensure that their components have minimal dependencies on other software libraries, so that these components can be deployed easily. In addition, Commons components will keep their interfaces as stable as possible, so that Apache users, as well as other Apache projects, can implement these components without having to worry about changes in the future.

Commons Sandbox 
The Commons Sandbox provides a workspace where Commons contributors collaborate and experiment on projects not included in the Commons Proper. Commons members champion projects in the Sandbox for promotion to the Commons Proper, and groups of developers work to enhance Sandbox projects until they meet the standards for promotion.

Commons Dormant 
The Commons Dormant is a collection of components that have been declared inactive due to little recent development activity. These components may be used, but must be built yourself. It is best to assume that these components will not be released in the near future.

See also 
 Google Guava

References

External links 
 Apache Commons

Java (programming language) libraries
Commons
Software using the Apache license